Johann Georg Mönckeberg (born 22 August 1839 in Hamburg, died 27 March 1908 in Hamburg) was a Hamburg politician, who served as First Mayor of Hamburg in 1890, 1893, 1896, 1899, 1902, 1904–1905, and 1908.

He studied law at Heidelberg University and at the University of Göttingen, and worked as a lawyer in Hamburg from 1862. He was elected to the Hamburg Parliament in 1871 and became a Senator in 1876, serving until his death.

The Mönckebergstraße is named in his honour. He was married to Elise Mathilde Tesdorpf.

References

External links
 

19th-century German lawyers
Members of the Hamburg Parliament
Mayors of Hamburg
Senators of Hamburg (before 1919)
Heidelberg University alumni
University of Göttingen alumni
1839 births
1908 deaths